Michael W. Torode was the second Chief Minister of Guernsey.  He was voted in by the States of Deliberation on 5 March 2007 and his term expired on 30 April 2008.

Torode succeeded Laurie Morgan following the Fallagate scandal that led to the whole Policy Council of Guernsey resigning en masse in February 2007. Prior to being Chief Minister, Torode's government position was that of Minister of Home Affairs.

Torode has been a member of the States of Guernsey since 1979.  He was initially a Deputy representing St. Martin and later a Conseiller, elected bailiwick-wide.  He was latterly a Deputy representing the South East electoral district.

References

Living people
Year of birth missing (living people)
Government ministers of Guernsey
Members of the States of Guernsey